Ernassa justina is a moth of the family Erebidae first described by Caspar Stoll in 1782. It is found in French Guiana and Suriname.

References

Phaegopterina
Moths described in 1782